Me Without You may refer to:

Songs
 "Me Without You" (Loick Essien song), 2011
 "Me Without You" (TobyMac song), 2012
 "Me Without You", by Ashley Tisdale from Guilty Pleasure
 "Me Without You", by Gwen Stefani from This Is What the Truth Feels Like
 "Me Without You", by the Monkees from Instant Replay
 "Me Without You", by Jennifer Nettles from That Girl
 "Me Without You", by Rebecca St. James from God
 "Me Without You", by Tim and the Glory Boys, 2021
 "Me (Without You)", by Andy Gibb from Andy Gibb's Greatest Hits

Other uses
 Me Without You (book), a 2011 book by Lisa Swerling and Ralph Lazar
 Me Without You (film), a 2001 British film directed by Sandra Goldbacher
 "Me Without You" (Medium), a television episode
 MewithoutYou, an American rock band